Teixeira is a Portuguese-language surname.

Teixeira may also refer to:

Places
Teixeira (Seia), Portugal
Teixeira, Paraíba, Brazil
Teixeira de Freitas, State of Bahia, Brazil
Teixeira Soares, Paraná, Brazil

See also
A Teixeira, a municipality in Ourense, Galicia, Spain
Teixeira Duarte, a Portuguese business conglomerate
Teixeira planisphere, a 1573 map by Domingos Teixeira 
Teixeiranthus, a genus of Brazilian plants
Teixeiras, a municipality in Minas Gerais, Brazil
Teixeirão stadium, São José do Rio Preto, São Paulo State, Brazil